Anne Ripley Smith (March 3, 1881 – June 1, 1949) was a Co-founder of AA, along with her husband, Dr. Bob Smith, and Bill Wilson. 

Anne Smith's influence in AA became widely known through her publication, Anne Smith's Journal, 1933-1939. 
She compiled and shared with early AAs and their families the materials comprising early AA's spiritual program—the Bible, Quiet Time, the teachings of Sam Shoemaker, the principles of the Oxford Group, and Christian literature of the day. Anne became one of the first members of Al-Anon when another founder, Bill W.' wife Lois Wilson visited her in Akron, Ohio during his stay at their house. Al-Anon officially began in 1951, after Anne’s death.

External links
 Anne Smith - Anne Smith's Journal, 1933-1939 
 A.A.'s Roots from Dr. Bob's Wife Anne 
 Dr. Bob's Home (Dr. Robert and Anne Smith House)

1881 births
1949 deaths
Alcoholics Anonymous